Meldal is a former municipality in Trøndelag county, Norway. The municipality existed from 1838 until its dissolution in 2020 when it joined Orkland Municipality. It was part of the Orkdalen region.  The administrative centre of the municipality was the village of Meldal.  Other villages included Løkken Verk, Bjørnli, Å, and Storås.

The municipality was most renowned for its mining activities at Løkken Verk, being the birthplace of the Orkla mining company, now Orkla Group.  It was also home to the annual Storåsfestivalen music festival.

At the time of its dissolution in 2020, the  municipality was the 184th largest by area out of the 422 municipalities in Norway. Meldal was also the 233rd most populous municipality in Norway with a population of 3,930.

General information

The prestegjeld of Meldal was established as a municipality on 1 January 1838 (see formannskapsdistrikt law). In 1839, the southern district of Meldal was separated to form the new Rennebu Municipality.

On 1 January 2018, the municipality switched from the old Sør-Trøndelag county to the new Trøndelag county.

On 1 January 2020, the municipalities of Agdenes, Orkdal, and Meldal along with the majority of Snillfjord were merged to form the new municipality of Orkland.

Name
The municipality (originally the parish) is named Meldal after its location in the Orkdalen valley. Thus the name means "the middle of the valley". Historically, the name was spelled Meldalen.

Coat of arms
The coat of arms was granted on 5 February 1985 and it was in use until 1 January 2020 when the municipality was dissolved. The official blazon is "Gules, an ear of corn in a roundel voided embattled Or". This means the arms have a red field (background) and the charge is the top of an ear of corn inside a gear-shaped circular ring. The charge has a tincture of Or which means it is commonly colored yellow, but if it is made out of metal, then gold is used. The design was chosen to symbolize the importance of local industry and agriculture. The arms were designed by Harald Ekseth.

Churches
The Church of Norway had two parishes within the municipality of Meldal. It is part of the Gauldal prosti (deanery) in the Diocese of Nidaros.

Geography
The municipality of Meldal was located along the Orkla River in the middle of the Orkdalen valley.  The lakes Hostovatnet and Svorksjøen were located along the northern border of the municipality.

There were five municipalities that bordered Meldal: Rindal to the west, Rennebu to the south, Midtre Gauldal and Melhus to the east, and Orkdal to the north.

The Løkken Station was the terminal station on the historic Thamshavn Line railway that used to travel through the municipality.

Government
While it existed, this municipality was responsible for primary education (through 10th grade), outpatient health services, senior citizen services, unemployment and other social services, zoning, economic development, and municipal roads. During its existence, this municipality was governed by a municipal council of elected representatives, which in turn elected a mayor. The municipality fell under the Trøndelag District Court and the Frostating Court of Appeal.

Municipal council
The municipal council of Meldal is made up of 19 representatives that are elected to four year terms.  The party breakdown of the final municipal council was as follows:

Mayors
The mayors of Meldal:

1838–1843: Ole Olsen Rigstad
1844–1849: Christian Rambech 
1850–1853: Ole Olsen Rigstad 
1854–1859: Erik Torgersen Loe 
1860–1863: Johannes Ring 
1864–1875: Ole Ellefsen
1876–1877: Rasmus Dombu 
1878–1879: Ole O. Steien 
1880–1883: Johannes Ring (H)
1884–1895: Ole O. Steien (V)
1896–1897: Rasmus Dombu (H)
1898–1904: Ole O. Steien (V)
1905–1907: Rasmus Hoel (H)
1908–1910: Anders O. Grut (H)
1911–1913: Rasmus Hoel (H)
1914–1919: J.E. Grefstad (V)
1920–1922: E.L. Staveli (V)
1923–1925: Gunnar Ree (Bp)
1926–1928: E.L. Staveli (V)
1929–1934: Gunnar Ree (Bp)
1935–1937: Ingvald Svinsås-Lo (V)
1938–1941: Johannes Togstad (Ap)
1941–1945: Thorleif Eie (NS)
1945–1951: Johannes Togstad (Ap)
1952–1956: Anders Kokkvoll (Ap)
1956–1967: Johan L. Strand (Ap)
1968–1973: Ivar Bolme (Ap)
1974–1980: John Akselsen (Ap)
1980–2005: Arne L. Haugen (Ap)
2005–2007: Ingrid Skarstein (Ap)
2007–2011: Ivar Syrstad (Sp)
2011–2019: Are Hilstad (Ap)

See also
List of former municipalities of Norway

References

External links

Municipal fact sheet from Statistics Norway 

 
Orkland
Former municipalities of Norway
1838 establishments in Norway
2020 disestablishments in Norway
Populated places disestablished in 2020